Mitchell Carmichael (born April 15, 1960) is an American politician. He is a former Republican member of the West Virginia Senate representing District 4 from 2012 until his defeat in 2020. Prior to his service in the Senate, Carmichael served in the West Virginia House of Delegates representing District 12 from 2000 through 2012. Carmichael was also a candidate for Governor of West Virginia in the 2011 West Virginia gubernatorial special election. As President of the state Senate from January 2017 to January 2021, he held the title Lieutenant Governor of West Virginia. After his defeat in 2020, Governor Jim Justice appointed Carmichael as West Virginia's economic development director.

Elections
2020: In the June 2020 Republican primary, Carmichael lost his bid for re-nomination to Amy Nichole Grady, a elementary school teacher who challenged Carmichael amid a state political battle over teacher pay. Grady won 39% of the vote to Carmichael's 35%.

2016: In the May 2016 Republican primary, Majority Leader Carmichael faced criticism from pro-union and pro-family groups based on a variety of votes and legislation. He was challenged by Dustin Lewis, a union pipeline worker, who he beat 59.5% to 40.5%. Carmichael then faced personal injury attorney Brian Prim in the general election, who he beat by a narrow 51% to 49% to a win a second term in the senate.

2012: When District 4 Senator Karen Facemyer retired and left a district seat open, Carmichael was unopposed in the May 8, 2012 Republican Primary, winning with 8,432 votes. He then won the November 6, 2012 General election with 20,951 votes (52.69%) against Democratic nominee Jackson County, West Virginia Sheriff Mike Bright.

2011: When incumbent Democratic Governor Joe Manchin left his position for the United States Senate, Carmichael ran in the eight-way May 14, 2011 Republican Primary, but lost to Bill Maloney; Maloney lost the October 4, 2011 special election to state Senator Earl Ray Tomblin.

2010: Carmichael and returning 2008 Democratic challenger Jo Boggess Phillips were both unopposed for their May 11, 2010 primaries, setting up a rematch; Carmichael won the November 2, 2010 General election with 3,383 votes (50.9%) against Phillips in his closest election to date.
2008: Carmichael was unopposed for the 2008 Republican Primary, and won the November 4, 2008 General election with 4,454 votes (53.1%) against Democratic nominee Jo Boggess Phillips.
2006: Carmichael was challenged in the 2006 Republican Primary but won. He then won the November 7, 2006 General election with 4,063 votes (62.5%) against Democratic nominee Steve Nicholas.
2004: Carmichael was unopposed for the 2004 Republican Primary, and won the November 2, 2004 General election with 5,944 votes (67.5%) against Democratic nominee Corbon Siders.
2002: Carmichael was unopposed for the 2002 Republican Primary, and won the November 5, 2002 General election with 3,969 votes (65.8%) against Democratic nominee Carroll Jett, who had run for the seat in 1998.
2000: When House District 12 Republican Delegate Karen Facemyer ran for the West Virginia Senate and left the seat open, Carmichael won the three-way 2000 Republican Primary with 1,016 votes (41.7%). He then won the November 7, 2000 General election with 4,584 votes (59.3%) against Democratic nominee Mike Dunlap.

References

External links
Official page at the West Virginia Legislature

Mitch Carmichael at Ballotpedia
Mitch B. Carmichael at the National Institute on Money in State Politics

1960 births
21st-century American politicians
Living people
Marshall University alumni
Republican Party members of the West Virginia House of Delegates
Politicians from Charleston, West Virginia
People from Jackson County, West Virginia
Presidents of the West Virginia State Senate
Republican Party West Virginia state senators